Christian Müller (born 26 December 1960) is a former professional German footballer.

Müller made 23 appearances in the 2. Bundesliga for Tennis Borussia Berlin and SpVgg Blau-Weiß 1890 Berlin during his playing career.

References

External links 
 

1960 births
Living people
German footballers
Association football forwards
2. Bundesliga players
Tennis Borussia Berlin players